Dudej (also Romanized as Dūdej; also known as Dodej Sarghan, Dūdak, Dūdar, Dūdej-e Zarqān, and Ūdaj) is a village in Zarqan Rural District, Zarqan District, Shiraz County, Fars Province, Iran. At the 2006 census, its population was 2,774, in 717 families.

References 

Populated places in Zarqan County